Candida Tobin Hon FTCL, LTCL  (5 January 1926 – 14 December 2008) was the author of the Tobin Method, a music education system for teaching music theory and practice to students of all ages and abilities.

Personal life

Tobin was born Doreen E. Pugh in Chingford, Essex on 5 January 1926 and grew up there with elder sisters Phyllis and Barbara.
Tobin was married twice, firstly to Derrick Llewelyn Mason (1924-1989) in 1949, and divorced soon after without any issue.
She subsequently married John M. Tobin in 1960, and had two children, Penelope A. and David Richard Tobin.

Tobin died at her UK home in Sawbridgeworth, Hertfordshire on 14 December 2008, aged 82, of cancer.

References

External links
Tobinmusic.co.uk, including an obituary
The Guardian obituary, 26 January 2009

1926 births
2008 deaths
Alumni of the Royal Academy of Music
Alumni of Trinity College of Music
British music educators
People from London
People from Chingford
Deaths from cancer in England
People from Sawbridgeworth